Andrew Campbell is an Australian curler from Melbourne. He is originally from Kenya, but grew up in Scotland.

At the international level, he is a  curler.

At the national level, he is a 1995 Australian men's champion curler, lead for Hugh Millikin.

Teams and events

References

External links

Living people
Australian male curlers
Pacific-Asian curling champions
Sportspeople from Melbourne
Scottish emigrants to Australia
Kenyan emigrants to Australia
Australian curling champions
Year of birth missing (living people)